This is a list of populated places in the Metropolitan Borough of Wirral.
 Barnston
 Bebington
 Beechwood
 Bidston
 Birkenhead
 Brimstage
 Bromborough
 Caldy
 Clatterbridge
 Claughton
 Eastham
 Egremont
 Ford
 Frankby
 Gayton
 Grange
 Greasby
 Heswall
 Hoylake
 Irby
 Landican
 Larton
 Leasowe
 Liscard
 Meols
 Moreton
 New Brighton
 New Ferry
 Newton
 Noctorum
 Oxton
 Pensby
 Port Sunlight
 Poulton
 Prenton
 Raby Mere
 Raby
 Rock Ferry
 Saughall Massie
 Seacombe
 Spital
 Storeton
 Thingwall
 Thornton Hough
 Thurstaston
 Tranmere
 Upton
 Wallasey
 Wallasey Village
 West Kirby
 Woodchurch
 Woodside

Towns and villages in the Metropolitan Borough of Wirral
Populated Places in Wirral Borough